Eupholus humeridens is a species of beetle belonging to the family Curculionidae.

Description
This species  is characterized by its cobalt blue colour, without speckles. There is a slight median longitudinal black line on the pronotum. The outer edge of the elytra and the edge of the pronotum are black. The elytra are pointed at the beetle's apex. The antennae are covered with sensory hairs.

Distribution
This species can be found in lowland rainforests of Papua New Guinea.

References

Bibliography
 Erster Beitrag zur Papuanischen Käferfauna. Abhandlungen und Berichte des Königlichen Zoologischen und Anthropologisch-Ethnographischen Museums zu Dresden, 16: 1–17.

External links
 Visuals Unlimited

Entiminae
Beetles described in 1895